Daniel G. Daigle (born February 7, 1939) is a Canadian politician. He served in the Legislative Assembly of New Brunswick from 1974 to 1978, as a Liberal member for the constituency of Madawaska South.

References

New Brunswick Liberal Association MLAs
Living people
1939 births